Thanapoom Sirichang is a Tasmanian composer, born in the city of Chiang Mai, Thailand. He began his music study at the age of eight by joining the Prince Royals College Ensemble. He studied music with Gain Tepparat and Yutthapol Sakthamjareon until he finished college in 1998. Sirichang completed a Bachelor Music degree with first class honours in 2002 at the Payap University in Chiang Mai before completing a Masters of Music in Composition in 2006 with Professor Douglas Knehans at the Tasmanian Conservatorium of Music. He now lives in Melbourne, Victoria.

References

Living people
Thanapoom Sirichang
Thanapoom Sirichang
Musicians from Melbourne
Year of birth missing (living people)